Earl "Chinna" Smith (born 6 August 1955), a.k.a. Earl Flute and Melchezidek the High Priest, is a Jamaican guitarist active since the late 1960s.  He is most well known for his work with the Soul Syndicate band and as guitarist for Bob Marley & the Wailers, among others, and has recorded with many reggae artists, appearing on more than 500 albums.

Biography
Smith was born 6 August 1955, and raised by family friends in the Greenwich Farm area of Kingston. His father and godfather were both sound system owners, his father's, Smith's, operated by Bunny Lee. Earl tried to emulate them using a toy sound system, leading to his nickname of "Tuner" (after a hi-fi amplifier), which was corrupted to "Chuner" and later "Chinna". Smith became interested in guitar as a teenager and made his own from sardine cans and fishing line. He formed a vocal group with his friend Earl Johnson (who later recorded as Earl Zero) and another youth, and they regularly sat in on sessions by the Soul Syndicate band. Smith was taught the basics of guitar by the band's guitarist Cleon Douglas, and became so adept at playing the band's repertoire that he was asked to join the band when Douglas emigrated to the United States.

In the late 1960s and early 1970s, Smith was the guitarist in Bunny Lee's house band that became known as The Aggrovators. Smith also played in Lee "Scratch" Perry's band The Upsetters. He worked with Bob Marley & the Wailers in 1976, and later worked with Bob Marley's sons Julian and Ziggy, touring internationally with the latter and playing on his Conscious Party album. He also recorded a few tracks under the pseudonym Earl Flute for producer Keith Hudson.

In 1986 Smith appeared as a member of Ernest Reed's (Jimmy Cliff) back-up band in the reggae-themed comedy Club Paradise.

In 1980, Smith launched his own High Times record label, releasing records by Soul Syndicate, Prince Alla, and Freddie McGregor, and also formed the High Times Players (which featured Augustus Pablo and Dean Fraser amongst others) who acted as backing band to Mutabaruka. Smith also co-produced Mutabaruka's 1983 debut studio album Check It!. The dub version of the album, credited to Smith, was released in 2004.

In the 2000s he worked on a series of albums recorded in his yard in St. Andrew, featuring veteran musicians and singers including Cedric Myton, Linval Thompson, Junior Murvin, and Kiddus I, this Inna de Yard series released by the French label Makasound. Two of these volumes feature Smith as lead musician, credited to "Earl Chinna Smith and Idrens", these released in 2008 and 2009.

In 2009, Smith recorded an instrumental version of The Heptones' album Heptones on Top as a tribute to the band, along with Lebert "Gibby" Morrison; They had worked on the album for more than ten years.

As well as working with many of the top Jamaican artists, Smith also recorded with artists such as Lauryn Hill (on The Miseducation of Lauryn Hill) and Amy Winehouse (on Frank).

In October 2013 it was announced that he was to be awarded a Silver Musgrave Medal later that month by the Institute of Jamaica.

In 2017, Smith worked with the Jamaican reggae singer, songwriter and producer Emmanuel Anebsa on his EP Black People.

In 2022 Earl Chinna Smith's InnadeYard Binghistra Movement, Surfing Medicine International 501(c)(3), and the Charles Town Maroons produced and released a benefit album online and as a limited edition vinyl LP printed by Third Man Pressing called: 'Maroon Songs: Born Free, Live Free, Ever Free' featuring Earl Chinna Smith, Errol Flabba Holt, Tyrone Downie and many other iconic Reggae artists and Maroon Drummers.

Personal life 
Smith's sons and daughters have followed him into a music career, with Jhamiela Smith (vocalist), Neosulann Smith (vocalist), Maria Smith (vocalist), Earl Smith Jr. (vocalist, Studio Engineer), JahJah (born Jahmai) (vocalist), and Ashea (born Itayi) a deejay. and his beautiful last born, named from his stage name "Chinna" Chynnah Smith.

Solo album discography
Sticky Fingers (1977), Third World
Home Grown (1991), High Times
Dub It! (2004), Nature Sounds
Inna De Yard (2008), Makasound - Earl Chinna Smith & Idrens
Inna De Yard vol. 2 (2009), Makasound - Earl Chinna Smith & Idrens
Guitars On Top (2009), Grass Yard - with Lebert "Gibby" Morrison

Artist played with

Ansel Collins
Alpha Blondy
Augustus Pablo
The Abyssinians
Bob Marley
Big Youth
Bim Sherman
Bunny Wailer
Charlie Hunter
Cornell Campbell
Delroy Wilson
Ernest Ranglin
The Ethiopians
Garland Jeffreys
Gregory Isaacs
Hugh Mundell
I-Roy
Jacob Miller
Keith Hudson
Junior Byles
Linval Thompson
Max Romeo
Jimmy Cliff
Johnny Clarke
Peter Tosh
Dennis Brown
Mutabaruka
Scientist
Lee Perry and The Upsetters
King Tubby
Freddie McGregor
Michael Rose
Mikey Dread
The Paragons
Prince Far I
Ras Michael
Revolutionaries
Rita Marley
Mighty Diamonds
Black Uhuru
Burning Spear
Heptones
Toots & The Maytals
Sizzla
Yabby You
Ziggy Marley and The Melody Makers
Lauryn Hill
Joss Stone
Amy Winehouse
Barry Ford
Barbara Paige
Dub Nation

Notes

References
Bradley, Lloyd (2000) This Is Reggae Music: The Story of Jamaica's Music, Grove Press, 
Campbell, Howard (2008) "Homage to the HEROES", Jamaica Gleaner, 22 July 2008, retrieved 6 December 2009
Cooke, Mel (2009) "Instrumental tribute to a classic", Jamaica Gleaner, 17 February 2009, retrieved 6 December 2009
Katz, David (2000) People Funny Boy: The Genius of Lee "Scratch" Perry, Payback Press, 
Moskowitz, David V. (2006) Caribbean Popular Music: an Encyclopedia of Reggae, Mento, Ska, Rock Steady, and Dancehall, Greenwood Press, 
Peter I "High Priest of Reggae Guitar: Interview with Earl "Chinna" Smith", Reggae-Vibes.com, retrieved 6 December 2009

Teacher "Maroon Songs: Born Free, Live Free, Ever Free", Reggae-Vibes.com, retrieved November 13, 2022

External links

Earl "Chinna" Smith at Roots Archives

1955 births
Living people
Musicians from Kingston, Jamaica
Jamaican reggae musicians
Jamaican guitarists
Male bass guitarists
The Wailers members
Jamaican bass guitarists
Recipients of the Musgrave Medal